Jack Slater is a character in Last Action Hero.

Jack Slater may also refer to:
Jack Slater (politician) (1927–1997), Australian politician
Jackie Slater (born 1954), retired National Football League player